Allen Dale "Sammy" Sessions (September 10, 1935 – December 17, 1977) was an American race car driver.

Born in Nashville, Michigan, Sessions died in a snowmobile racing accident in Alexandria, Minnesota.  He drove in the USAC Championship Car series, racing in the 1965-1975 seasons with 62 starts, including the Indianapolis 500 in 1968-1973 and 1975.  He finished in the top ten 21 times, with his best finish in 4th position on 7 occasions.

Based on information in "Donald Davidson's Indianapolis 500 Mile Race Annual 1974," Sessions was not given a chance to qualify for the 1974 Indy 500.  Because of the "fuel crisis," Qualifications were cut to two days in 1974.  May 11 was a short day of qualifying due to weather; on May 18 qualifications began about 15 minutes late due to administrative delays.  Sam Sessions was at the line with engine running on May 18 when 6PM arrived.  There were thirty-three cars in the field, but not everyone who entered in 1974 had a chance to qualify.

Sessions was also the 1972 USAC Sprint Car Series Champion.

Indianapolis 500 results

1935 births
1977 deaths
Indianapolis 500 drivers
People from Barry County, Michigan
Racing drivers from Michigan

A. J. Foyt Enterprises drivers
Sports deaths in Minnesota